The 2023 All-Ireland Under-20 Football Championship is scheduled to be the fifth staging of the All-Ireland Under-20 Championship and the 60th staging overall of a Gaelic football championship for players between the minor and senior grades. The championship is scheduled to run from 21 March to 13 May 2023.

Tyrone will enter the championship as the defending champions.

Connacht Under-20 Football Championship

Connacht quarter-final

Connacht semi-finals

Connacht final

Leinster Under-20 Football Championship

Leinster group 1

Group 1 table

{| class="wikitable" style="text-align:center"
!width=20|
!width=150 style="text-align:left;"|Team
!width=20|
!width=20|
!width=20|
!width=20|
!width=40|
!width=40|
!width=20|
!width=20|
|- style="background:#ccffcc"
|1||align=left| Carlow ||0||0||0||0||0||0||0||0
|- style="background:#FFFFE0"
|2||align=left| Longford ||0||0||0||0||0||0||0||0
|- 
|3||align=left| Laois ||0||0||0||0||0||0||0||0
|-
|4||align=left| Meath ||0||0||0||0||0||0||0||0
|}

Group 1 fixtures

Leinster group 2

Group 2 table

{| class="wikitable" style="text-align:center"
!width=20|
!width=150 style="text-align:left;"|Team
!width=20|
!width=20|
!width=20|
!width=20|
!width=40|
!width=40|
!width=20|
!width=20|
|- style="background:#ccffcc"
|1||align=left| Wicklow ||0||0||0||0||0||0||0||0
|- style="background:#FFFFE0"
|2||align=left| Louth ||0||0||0||0||0||0||0||0
|- 
|3||align=left| Dublin ||0||0||0||0||0||0||0||0
|-
|4||align=left| Offaly ||0||0||0||0||0||0||0||0
|}

Group 2 fixtures

Leinster group 3

Group 3 table

{| class="wikitable" style="text-align:center"
!width=20|
!width=150 style="text-align:left;"|Team
!width=20|
!width=20|
!width=20|
!width=20|
!width=40|
!width=40|
!width=20|
!width=20|
|- style="background:#FFFFE0"
|1||align=left| Wexford ||0||0||0||0||0||0||0||0
|- style="background:#FFFFE0"
|2||align=left| Westmeath ||0||0||0||0||0||0||0||0
|- 
|3||align=left| Kildare ||0||0||0||0||0||0||0||0
|}

Group 3 fixtures

Leinster quarter-finals

Leinster semi-finals

Leinster final

Munster Under-20 Football Championship

Munster quarter-finals

Munster semi-finals

Munster final

Ulster Under-20 Football Championship

Ulster preliminary round

Ulster quarter-finals

Ulster semi-finals

Ulster final

All-Ireland Under-20 Football Championship

All-Ireland semi-finals

All-Ireland final

References

All-Ireland Under-20 Football Championship
All-Ireland Under-20 Football Championships